Steve McNally (born 28 September 1958) is a New Zealand cricketer. He played in 33 first-class and 19 List A matches for Canterbury from 1978 to 1986.

See also
 List of Canterbury representative cricketers

References

External links
 

1958 births
Living people
New Zealand cricketers
Canterbury cricketers
Cricketers from Christchurch